Kinderen geen bezwaar is a Dutch sitcom, developed by the VARA and written by Haye van der Heyden. The first episode aired on Nederland 1 on 25 September 2004, replacing the popular series . After the ninth season, which was scheduled to air in January 2013, the series was not renewed. This is the result of a recurring discussion whether Dutch public television should provide comedy or not. The last six episodes were filmed from 29 May till 7 July 2012. Repeats of Kinderen geen bezwaar attracted audiences of more than one million people.

Anita Witzier, Hans Klok, Chantal Janzen, Edwin Rutten and others did cameos in Kinderen geen bezwaar.

Premise 
Gerard van Doorn (Alfred van den Heuvel) and Maud Zegers (Anne-Mieke Ruyten) are a married couple. They met each other through a personal advertisement (hence the title, Kinderen geen bezwaar, which translates to Children no objection). They live with two children from previous marriages: Gerard's son Daan (Joey van der Velden) and Maud's daughter Julia (Céline Purcell). Maud works as a psychotherapist and Gerard is a homemaker. As such, Gerard doesn't fit the stereotypical profile of Dutch men and Maud often ridicules him for being unmanly.

Cast 
 Alfred van den Heuvel
 Anne-Mieke Ruyten
 Céline Purcell
 Joey van der Velden
 Bobbie Koek
 Rufus Hegeman
 Ingeborg Elzevier
 Bart Oomen

Trivia 
Ruyten's real husband, Ron Cornet, plays a patient of hers.

References

External links 

  Official website
  Online episodes of Kinderen geen bezwaar at Uitzending Gemist
 

2004 Dutch television series debuts
Dutch television sitcoms
2000s Dutch television series
NPO 1 original programming